Robert Percival Walker  was a Canadian Anglican priest in the middle of the 20th century.

Walker was educated at University of Toronto. Ordained in the 1930s, his first post was a curacy in Guelph. After that he served at several parishes in Toronto. He was Rector of St Luke, Peterborough, Ontario from 1956 to 1972; and its Archdeacon from 1962.

References

University of Toronto alumni
Archdeacons of Peterborough, ON
20th-century Canadian Anglican priests
Year of birth missing
Year of death missing